The Ruwenzori otter shrew (Micropotamogale ruwenzorii) is a species of semiaquatic dwarf otter shrew of the family Potamogalidae.  It is found in the Democratic Republic of the Congo, Rwanda, and Uganda. Otter shrews are shrew-like afrotherian mammals found in sub-Saharan Africa. They are most closely related to the tenrecs of Madagascar.

Behavior and habitat 

Ruwenzori otter shrews live in the rivers and streams of various biomes, mostly in forests. Its prey is primarily small animals, such as fish, crabs, worms, insects, and small frogs. It is threatened by habitat loss.

References

Afrosoricida
Mammals described in 1955
Aquatic mammals
Taxonomy articles created by Polbot